Chamrajpet Assembly constituency is one of the seats in Karnataka Legislative Assembly in India. It is part of Bangalore Central Lok Sabha seat.

Members of Assembly 
 1967 : R. D. Sagar (INC)
 2004 : S. M. Krishna (INC)   (Resigned soon to become MH Governor) 
 2004 by-poll : Zameer Ahmed Khan (JD-S)

Election Results

1967 Assembly Election
 R. D. Sagar (INC) : 14,241 votes    
 B.K. Krishniah (IND) : 10,590

2018 Assembly Election
 B.Z. Zameer Ahmed Khan (INC) : 65,339 votes  
 M Lakshminarayana (BJP) : 32202 votes

See also 
 List of constituencies of Karnataka Legislative Assembly

References 

}

Assembly constituencies of Karnataka